The 2015 CAF Super Cup (officially the 2015 Orange CAF Super Cup for sponsorship reasons) was the 23rd CAF Super Cup, an annual football match in Africa organized by the Confederation of African Football (CAF), between the winners of the previous season's two CAF club competitions, the CAF Champions League and the CAF Confederation Cup.

The match was played between ES Sétif of Algeria, the 2014 CAF Champions League winner, and Al-Ahly of Egypt, the 2014 CAF Confederation Cup winner. It was hosted by ES Sétif at the Stade Mustapha Tchaker in Blida on 21 February 2015.

After a 1–1 draw, ES Sétif won 6–5 on penalties to become the first Algerian team to win the CAF Super Cup.

Teams

Rules
The CAF Super Cup was played as a single match, with the CAF Champions League winner hosting the match. If the score was tied at the end of regulation, the penalty shoot-out would be used to determine the winner (no extra time would be played).

Match

References

External links
Orange CAF Super Cup 2015, CAFonline.com

2015
Super
ES Sétif matches
Al Ahly SC matches
Association football penalty shoot-outs